Ronquillo may refer to:

Gonzalo Ronquillo de Peñalosa (died 1583), the fourth Spanish governor of the Philippines
Charo Ronquillo (born 1990), Filipino fashion model
Diego Ronquillo, the fifth Spanish governor of the Philippines
Luis Córdoba Ronquillo (died 1640), Roman Catholic Bishop of Trujillo and Bishop of Cartagena
María Luisa Ronquillo (born 1956), Mexican long-distance runner
Pablo Ronquillo, Cuban baseball outfielder in the Cuban League
Perry Ronquillo (born 1965), former award-winning PBA coach
Rodrigo Ronquillo (1471–1552), Spanish noble known for his intervention at the Revolt of the Comuneros

See also
El Ronquillo, town in the province of Seville, Spain
Ronquillo: Tubong Cavite, Laking Tondo, 1993 Filipino film
Reinkella
Ronquil
Ránquil